Euzebiusz Huchracki, (October 15, 1885 – May 6, 1942) was a Polish Franciscan friar, superior of the monastery in Miejska Górka, chaplain of the Secular Franciscan Order, who shortly after the Nazi invasion of Poland was arrested by the Gestapo, imprisoned at several places of detention, and lastly deported to the Dachau concentration camp, and murdered.

 is currently one of the 122 Polish martyrs of the Second World War who are included in the beatification process initiated in 1994, whose first beatification session was held in Warsaw in 2003 (see Słudzy Boży). A person nominated for beatification receives within the Roman Catholic Church the title of "Servant of God"; once he is actually beatified he is accorded the title of "Venerable" and "Blessed", which are a prerequisite for sainthood conferred in a process known as canonization.

See also
108 Martyrs of World War II
List of Servants of God
The Holocaust in Poland

References

1885 births
1942 deaths
Polish civilians killed in World War II
University of Wrocław alumni
People from Katowice
People from the Province of Silesia
Polish Friars Minor
Polish people who died in Dachau concentration camp
20th-century Polish Roman Catholic priests
Polish Servants of God
20th-century venerated Christians
Catholic saints and blesseds of the Nazi era